Ghulam Dastagir Azad (born 1950 in Kang District, Nimruz Province) is the former governor of Nimruz Province, Afghanistan, having  served from 2005 to August 2010.

In 2008, Azad survived a suicide attack that killed four of his bodyguards.

In May 2010, 8 Suicide attackers entered Azad's office with intention to kill him. He survived all eight attacks, but two of his bodyguards died and Gul Makai Osmani, a female member of the Nimroz legislature, and a bystander were killed in this attack.

Unconfirmed reports state that following this attack, the Governor was transported using unknown cars and with civilian-dressed bodyguards.

References

Governors of Nimruz Province
Living people
1950 births